"Bad Romance" is a 2009 song by Lady Gaga.

Bad Romance may also refer to:
 Bad Romance (film), a Chinese film based on Gaga's song
 Bad Romance: The Series, a 2016 Thai TV series